The 2023 Alps Tour is the 23rd season of the Alps Tour, one of the third-tier tours recognised by the European Tour.

Schedule
The following table lists official events during the 2023 season.

Notes

References

Alps Tour
Alps Tour